Changtu County is a county in the northeast of Liaoning province, China, bordering Jilin to the northeast and Inner Mongolia in the northwest. It is served by both China National Highway 102 and G1 Beijing–Harbin Expressway.

Administrative divisions

There are 33 towns under the county's administration.

Towns:







Quantou























Daxing



Demographics 
As of 2019, Changtu County has a population of 984,226 people, of which 29.89% lived in urban settlements, and the remaining 70.11% lived in rural ones. Of this population, 50.5% was male, 49.5% was female, 13.11% were aged 17 and under, 20.05% were between 18 and 34 years old, 43.68% were between 35 and 59, and the remaining 23.16% were aged 60 and older.

Climate

Economy 
Changtu County's gross domestic product (GDP) reached a total of ¥13.32 billion in 2019, a 2.9% increase from the previous year. Of this, 46.5% came from the county's primary sector, 13.0% came from the secondary sector, and 40.5% came from the tertiary sector.

As of 2019, the average annual salary in Changtu County is ¥34,915, a 7.6% increase from the previous year. Urban unemployment in 2019 was 3.74%.

Agriculture and animal husbandry 
The county's agriculture, forestry, animal husbandry, and fishing industries combined accounted for ¥13.87 billion of economic value in 2019. Agriculture in the county is dominated by the growing of maize, although the cultivation of seed oil, vegetables, soybeans, and rice are also substantial. Large amounts of swine, cattle, and poultry are raised in Changtu County. A smaller, yet substantial, amount of sheep are also raised.

Tourism 
In 2019, 540,000 tourists visited Changtu County, generating revenue of ¥30 million.

Education
As of 2019, the county reported having 98 public schools serving 66,397 students. The county has 187 kindergartens, including 44 public ones. There are 44 primary schools, 36 junior high schools, 5 nine-year schools, 3 high schools, as well as a number of vocational schools.

High schools 

One of the three high schools serving the county is Changtu No.1 Senior High, which has over 2,500 students. The school's campus covers an area of 90,600 square metres.

Middle schools 

A school that is close to one-third the size of No.1 Senior High is Shiyan Junior High. This school covers about 28 kilometers squared.

Healthcare 
As of 2019, Changtu County has 36 medical institutions, which contain 3,845 hospital beds.

References

External links
Official website of Changtu County

 
County-level divisions of Liaoning
Tieling